Salt Springs Reservoir is a reservoir in the eastern portions of Amador County and Calaveras County of California in the Sierra Nevada about  east-northeast of Jackson.

The  reservoir is formed by Salt Springs Dam on the North Fork of the Mokelumne River. It is owned by Pacific Gas and Electric and its sole purpose is hydroelectricity production, though limited recreation is available. A short pipeline from the reservoir conveys water to the 44 MW Salt Springs Powerhouse. Some of the water is returned to the river downstream, but much of it flows into the Tiger Creek Conduit, a concrete flume that moves water downstream for use in other powerhouses in PG&E's Mokelumne River Project (FERC Project 137).

The dam has a history of settlement problems caused by poor consolidation of the rocks during construction. The concrete face has been cracked many times by the movement, causing leaks. The surface of the dam consists of cracks, craters and shotcrete overlays. It was decided to use a flexible geomembrane to cover the portions of the dam with the greatest leakage. The installation of the membrane was completed in 2005.

The dam is being examined as the lower pool in a 380-1,140 MW pumped-storage project with the Bear River Dam as the upper pool.

See also
List of dams and reservoirs in California
List of lakes in California

References

Columbia Gazetteer of North America
International Water Power and Dam Construction

Reservoirs in Amador County, California
Reservoirs in Calaveras County, California
Lakes of the Sierra Nevada (United States)
Mokelumne River
Eldorado National Forest
Reservoirs in Northern California
Dams completed in 1931
1931 establishments in California